Songs before Sunrise is a collection of poems relating to Italy, and particularly its unification, by Algernon Charles Swinburne. It was published in 1871 and can be seen as an extension of his earlier long poem, "A Song of Italy". Swinburne was partly inspired to write the songs by a meeting with Italian patriot Giuseppe Mazzini in March 1867.

External links

Full text at Project Gutenberg

1871 books
English poetry collections
Books about Italy
1867 in Italy
1871 in Italy
Works by Algernon Charles Swinburne